Ağrı Ahmed-i Hani Airport  is an airport in Ağrı, in eastern Turkey.

Overview

The airport was opened on 8 January 1998 as Ağrı Airport. It was temporarily closed down in 2009 to widen and upgrade the apron and runway, which was completed in 2011. In 2015, a new terminal building was completed and the airport's name was changed to Ağrı Ahmed-i Hani Airport.

Airlines and destinations

Statistics

Ground transport
The D.965 connects the airport to Ağrı.

References

Airports in Turkey
Buildings and structures in Ağrı Province
Transport in Ağrı Province